Scot Facer Proctor and Maurine Jensen Proctor are the founders of the Latter-day Saint oriented website Meridian Magazine.  They have also issued a revised edition of Lucy Mack Smith's history of Joseph Smith which reintroduces material from Lucy's 1845 manuscript that was removed before Lucy's history was originally published. This version of Lucy's history is cited by such scholars such as Susan Easton Black and Craig J. Ostler.  The Proctors' work is also among those cited in the bibliography to Scott R. Petersen's 2005 book Where Have All The Prophets Gone. The Proctors have also published a new edition of the Autobiography of Parley Parker Pratt.

The Proctors have compiled a book Light from the Dust which presents photos of areas they believe are similar scenes to where the events of the Book of Mormon took place.  For this book the Proctors did on-site studies in Oman. Scholars such as Andrew H. Hedges though have quoted the Proctor's work, although Fred W. Nelson of the Neal A. Maxwell Institute felt that their work was "less reputable" in the area of Book of Mormon geography and archaeology than that of "reputable scholars" such as John Clark or John Sorenson.

The Proctors wrote The Gathering, Mormon Pioneers on the Trail to Zion. The Gathering was cited in the footnotes to Gregory A. Prince and William Robert Wright's book David O. McKay and the Rise of Modern Mormonism.

The Proctors are the parents of eleven children in their combined families from prior marriages. They reside in Alpine,Utah.

The Proctors have produced a DVD entitled Gordon B. Hinckley - Temple Builder.

Maurine Proctor received her bachelor's degree from the University of Utah and her master's degree from Harvard University.  She worked for the Chicago Sun-Times before she and her husband started their own magazine.  She has also written a book entitled From Adams Rib to Women's Lib.

Scot Proctor is a professional photographer who wrote Witness of the Light which was a photographic book about Joseph Smith.  The LDS Church has included his photos in their publications at times.

Works

Autobiography of Parley P. Pratt Revised and Enhanced Edition
Revised and Enhanced History of Joseph Smith by His Mother
Gathering The Mormon Pioneers on the Trail to Zion
Creating a New Millennium: The Latter-day Saints in the Coming Century.  
Light From the Dust: A Photographic Exploration into the Ancient World of The Book of Mormon
Source of the Light: A Witness and Testimony of Jesus Christ, the Savior and Redeemer of All
Witness of the Light: A Photographic Journey in the Footsteps of the American Prophet Joseph Smith

See also 
 Bloggernacle
 Culture of The Church of Jesus Christ of Latter-day Saints

Notes

References 
  - article on vandalism of Meridian magazine site

Further reading

 - article that mentions Proctor's book
 - Meridian page on the Proctors
  — article that mentions the Proctor's work.

External links 
 
 
 
 
 

American Latter Day Saint writers
Living people
Married couples
Editors of Latter Day Saint publications
Latter Day Saints from Virginia
Year of birth missing (living people)